Tytsjerk is a village in Tytsjerksteradiel in the province of Friesland in the Netherlands. It had a population of 1,614 in January 2017.

History 
The village was first mentioned in 1392 as Thiatzerckera, and means "the church of Tije (person)". Tytsjerk developed in the late middle ages. It had a road connection to Leeuwarden which resulted the construction of several estates.

The foundations of the church indicate that it already must have existed in the 13th century. The village itself is first mentioned in an ecclesiastical document from the year 1328. In 1720 the foundations of the contemporary church were laid.
The bronze church bell, which dates from 1608, was taken to Germany during World War II to be melted for the production of bullets and bombs, but was returned. This bell once hung in a separate belfry but found its place in the tower of the church itself already two centuries ago.

Tytsjerk was home to 344 people in 1840.

Bosk fan Ypey 
Near the village park Vijversburg can be found, also known as the 'Bosk fan Ypey' or 'Bos van Ypey' (Forest of Ypey). This domain was earlier held by the rich families Looxma and Ypey. Later it became the property of the 'Op Toutenburg' Foundation. The park is laid out by the landscape architect .

Windmills
There are two windmills in the village, the Himriksmole and Lytse Geast.

Community

Population 
1900 - 761
1910 - 828
1940 - 902
1954 - 829
1959 - 786
1964 - 954
1969 - 1255
1974 - 1435
2004 - 1400
2008 - 1539

Gallery

References

External links

 Website Association for Village interests Tytsjerk
 Foundation Vijversburg
 Website Lytse Geast

Tytsjerksteradiel
Populated places in Friesland